Hugh B. Williamson (born April 17, 1954) is an American politician from Georgia. Williamson is a Republican member of the Georgia House of Representatives since 2011.

Personal life 
Williamson's wife is Vickie Williamson. They have four children. Williamson and his family live on Monroe, Georgia.

References

External links 
 Bruce Williamson at ballotpedia.org
 Bruce Williamson at ourcampaigns.com

1954 births
Living people
People from Monroe, Georgia
21st-century American politicians
Republican Party members of the Georgia House of Representatives